Ruth Putnam (18 July 1856, Yonkers, New York – 12 February 1931, Geneva, Switzerland) was an author, suffragist, and alumni trustee of Cornell University.

One of eleven children of the publisher George Palmer Putnam and his wife Victorine Haven Putnam, Ruth Putnam received her bachelor's degree in 1878 from Cornell University. (In 1873 Emma Sheffield Eastman was the first woman to graduate from Cornell University.) Ruth Putnam wrote a number of historical works and consulted original sources in Dutch, French, and German, as well as English. She also wrote a biography of her eldest sibling Mary Corinna Putnam Jacobi, who was a famous physician and suffragist.

Selected publications
 as collaborator with Alfred John Church:  (historical novel)
  (translated into Dutch as Willem de Zwijger, Prins van Oranje (1900) by Dirk Christiaan Nijhoff)
 
as editor with Eva Palmer Brownell, Maud Wilder Goodwin, and Alice Carrington Royce: 
as translator with Oscar Albert Bierstadt: ; a translation and abridgment of the 8-volume Geschiedenis van het Nederlandsche volk by Petrus Johannes Blok

with the collaboration of Herbert Ingram Priestley:

References

External links

 

1856 births
1931 deaths
Cornell University alumni
19th-century American women writers
20th-century American women writers
American women's rights activists
American feminists
American suffragists
People from Yonkers, New York